Mister World Korea is an annual national male beauty pageant responsible for selecting South Korea's representative to the Mister World pageant.

Miss and Mister World Korea 2015 took place on 20 November at the Alpensia Resort in Pyeongchang. The current titleholder is Im Seung-jun, Mister World Korea 2015.

History
In 2009, Hankook Ilbo sent first Mister World contestant who is represent Korea. The president of Miss and Mister World Korea is Park Jeong-ah.

Titleholders

Representatives to international beauty pageants 
Color keys

Mister World 
The winner of Mister World Korea represents his country at Mister World. Miss and Mister World Korea Organization sent Mister World Korea winner to Mister World in 2010.

See also
Mister World

 Miss Korea
 Miss Queen Korea
 Miss Grand Korea
 Mister International Korea

References

External links
Official website

South Korean popular culture
Beauty pageants in South Korea
Korea
South Korean awards
Annual events in South Korea